Solangella is a genus of beetles in the family Cerambycidae, containing the following species:

 Solangella lachrymosa (Martins & Monné, 1975)
 Solangella meridana (Bates, 1872)
 Solangella micromacula Martins, 1997

References

Eburiini